The following list of French general officers (Peninsular War) lists the générals (général de brigade and général de division)  and maréchals d'Empire, that is, the French general officers who served in the First French Empire's Grande Armée in Spain and Portugal during the Peninsular War (1808–1814). The rank given refers to that held until 1814. The list includes foreign nationals who fought in French military units.

Overview
Napoleon had intended the campaign on the Peninsula to be a walkover, but what he would come to call the Spanish Ulcer, ended up with him having had to send in thirteen of his maréchals (ten of whom were of the first promotion – of fourteen – and included Soult, one of only six men to have been appointed Marshal General of France in the history of France), as well as two "honorary" marshals, Kellermann and Lefebvre, and enter Madrid himself. Apart from the original 28,000 troops that had entered Spain under Junot, heading for Portugal, Napoleon would have to send in a further two hundred and seventy thousand men — more than half of the empire's total military strength.

List

See also
Chronology of events of the Peninsular War
List of Portuguese general officers (Peninsular War)
List of Spanish general officers (Peninsular War)
List of French generals of the Revolutionary and Napoleonic Wars

References

French generals
19th century in Portugal
19th century in Spain
Conflicts in 1807
Conflicts in 1808
Conflicts in 1809
Conflicts in 1810
Conflicts in 1811
Conflicts in 1812
Conflicts in 1813
Conflicts in 1814
France–Portugal relations
France–Spain relations
France–United Kingdom relations
Guerrilla wars
King's German Legion
Napoleonic Wars
Portugal–Spain relations
Portugal–United Kingdom relations
Wars involving France
Wars involving Portugal
Wars involving Spain
Wars involving the United Kingdom
Wars of independence
Lists of French military personnel
+

French military personnel of the Napoleonic Wars
French commanders of the Napoleonic Wars
French peninsula